The Long Beach Township Beach Patrol (LBTBP) was founded in 1936 to meet the growing demand for an ocean rescue force in the growing ocean community known as Long Beach Island, specifically Long Beach Township, New Jersey, United States. The organization employs over 200 full and part-time staff including lifeguards, office/headquarters staff and other positions relevant to its services. The Long Beach Township Beach Patrol guards  of ocean beaches and two bay beaches and is one of the largest beach patrols in the United States.

Organization
The  of protected area (including bay beaches) are overseen by the beach patrol chief and are further divided into patrols.  Each patrol has its own captain, lieutenant, and acting lieutenant. Beaches guarded by LBTBP from north to south are: Loveladies, North Beach, Brant Beach, Beach Haven Crest, Spray Beach, and Holgate.

Competitions
Each of the patrols compete in annual in-house competitions.  These competitions encourage lifeguards to maintain their fitness and test skills like rowing, paddling, swimming and running.  Towards the end of each summer there is a two-day competition known as Mayor's Cup.  All of the patrols compete to win this event, however North Beach and Loveladies are combined due to their small size.

Programs 

LBTBP has multiple programs:

IRB Program
The IRB (Inflatable Rescue Boat) program consists of LBTBP lifeguards who have been chosen to participate in it. The IRBs are used to patrol along the shore line (just outside the swimming area) to provide backup for rescues, setup for competitions and assist with un-cooperative boaters and personal water craft users.

SCUBA Search and Rescue
Lifeguards who display excellent work ethic can apply to be part of the SCUBA search and rescue team, which provides search and rescue services for LBTBP when dealing with submerged victims. The team also assists in helping setup race and competition courses.

LIT Program
The LIT (Lifeguard In Training) program gives children ages 11–15 the chance to learn the rescue techniques used by LBTBP in order to greatly improve their chance of being hired at the age of 16. LIT's will learn rescue techniques, procedures and radio codes, CPR and First Aid, and more.

Beachwheels program
The Beachwheels program was created in 1992 to allow mentally and physically handicapped children and adults the opportunity to experience the beach.

References 

1936 establishments in New Jersey
Lifesaving in the United States
Long Beach Township, New Jersey
Organizations established in 1936
Lifesaving organizations